Louis-François Jauffret (4 October 1770 – 11 December 1840) was an 18th–19th-century French educator, poet and fabulist.

Works 
Journalism
 Gazette des tribunaux, 1791-1793
 Histoire impartiale du procès de Louis XVI, ci-devant roi des Français 1798

Fables
1791: Les charmes de l'enfance et les plaisirs de l'amour maternel, (Paris, Eymery)
1795: Romances historiques
1802: Œuvres de Berquin
1803: Œuvres posthumes by Florian
1804: Le taureau, (Paris, Demoraine)
1814: Fables nouvelles dédiées à SAR la duchesse d'Angoulême, (Paris, Maradan)
1826: Lettres sur les fabulistes anciens et modernes, (Paris, Pichon-Béchet)
1827: Trois fables sur la girafe, with a lithograph of a giraffe, a note on this animal and a Latin translation of the first fable by M. Adolphe Jauffret, (Marseille et Paris, Pichon-Béchet)

Books for youth
1796–1799: Le courrier des enfants, (Paris, Leclère)
1797: Petit théâtre de famille
1799: Les Merveilles du corps humain, from anatomical drawings provided by Cuvier, (Paris, Leclère)
1799: Dictionnaire étymologique de la langue française à l'usage de la jeunesse
1798: Voyage au jardin des plantes, containing the description of the natural history galleries, and greenhouses where foreign shrubs are housed (on the advice of Jussieu) (Paris, Guillaume)
1799: Voyages de Rolando et de ses compagnons de fortune autour du monde, (Paris, Leclère)
1800–1801: Le courrier des adolescents, (Paris, Leclère)
1803: La gymnastique de la jeunesse
1803: Promenades de Jauffret à la campagne faites dans le dessein de donner aux jeunes gens une idée du bonheur qui peut résulter pour l'homme de l'étude de lui-même et de la contemplation de la nature, (Paris, Demoraine)
 La journée ou l'emploi du temps, ouvrage contenant les premiers éléments de connaissances utiles aux enfants qui commencent à lire
1805: Les six jours ou leçons d'un père à son fils sur l'origine du monde, d'après la Bible, contenant des notions simples sur l'histoire naturelle des minéraux, des végétaux, des animaux et de l'homme, (Paris, Galland)
1806–1807: La corbeille de fleurs et le panier de fruits, ou la récolte de chaque mois offerte aux demoiselles, (Paris, Perlet)
 Le Panier de fruits
1806: Éducation pratique d'Adolphe et Gustave, ou recueil des leçons donné par L. Jauffret à ses enfants, (Lyon, Ballanche)
1806: Géographie dramatique de la jeunesse, ou nouvelle méthode amusante pour apprendre la géographie, mises en dialogues et scènes propres à être représentées dans les pensionnats et dans les familles
1807: Le Molière de la jeunesse ou comédies choisies de Molière, (Paris, Nyon)
1816:  Petite école des arts et métiers, (Paris, Eymery)

Other
1796: Projet d'établir en France une manufacture de végétaux artificiels qui doit occuper utilement dans l'enceinte de Paris environ 4000 femmes d'après les nouveaux procédés de T.J. Wenzel
1799: Jeux zoologiques et géographiques (Paris, Leclère)
1804: Éléments de zoographie, ou l'histoire des animaux considérés relativement au degré d'étendue des régions que chaque espèce occupe sur la surface du globe, (Paris, Demoraine)
 Pièces historiques sur la peste de Marseille et d'une partie de la Provence en 1720,1721 et 1722.
 L'art épistolaire, Paroles mémorables des grands hommes de l'antiquité et des temps modernes (written with his brother Gaspard-André Jauffret)

Bibliography 
Robert Reboul: Louis-François Jauffret, sa vie, ses œuvres, 1869 on Gallica
Robert Reboul: Les Cartons d'un bibliothécaire de Marseille, 1875
Jean-Luc Chappey: La Société des observateurs de l'homme, 2002
Adriana S. Benzaquén: Childhood, Identity and Human Science in the Enlightenment, in History Workshop Journal, 2004
Cynthia J. Koepp: Dialogues and Dramas for Children: The Enlightened Pedagogy of Louis-François Jauffret, The Faculty of Education, University of Cambridge (Friday September 9, 2005)

See also 
 Société des observateurs de l'homme

External links 
 Louis-François Jauffret on Data.bnf.fr

French fabulists
French educators
18th-century French journalists
18th-century French poets
18th-century French male writers
19th-century French poets
French children's writers
People from Provence
1770 births
1840 deaths